Fred Zimmerman may refer to:
 Frederick Zimmermann (1906–1967), American double bassist and teacher
 Frederick Hinde Zimmerman (1864–1924), American banker, farmer, real estate entrepreneur, businessman, and hotel owner
 Fred R. Zimmerman (1880–1954), Republican politician who became Governor of Wisconsin
 J. Fred Zimmerman Jr. (1871–1948), American theater manager and stage producer
 J. Fred Zimmerman Sr. (1843–1925), American theater owner and leader of the Theatrical Syndicate